SS Magdapur was a cargo ship mined and sunk off Thorpeness, Suffolk, by a Nazi German submarine in the Second World War.

The SS Magdapur sailed for the Brocklebank Line.

On 10 September 1939, one week after the declaration of war, she was underway in ballast from Tyne to Southampton, her master was Arthur Dixon. She sank at 17:25. Six people died as a result of the attack, but 75 people were rescued from the sea by the Aldeburgh lifeboat Abdy Beauclerk. Her crew included lascars.

References

1920 ships
Maritime incidents in September 1939
Ships built on the River Clyde
Conflicts in 1939
Ships of Scotland
Ships sunk by German submarines in World War II
British Indian history
World War II shipwrecks in the North Sea
Cargo ships of the United Kingdom
Ships sunk by mines
Shipwrecks of England
History of Suffolk
Disasters in Suffolk
1939 in the United Kingdom
20th century in Suffolk